Li Shi or Lishi may refer to:

 Lishi (理事; "Noumenon and Phenomenon"), a Zen Buddhist concept, see Five Ranks#Interplay of Absolute and Relative

People
 Li Shi (emperor) (died 361), emperor of Cheng Han 

 Lishi (Three Kingdoms) (李氏, died 263), noble lady and aristocrat from the Three Kingdoms period.

Li Shi (Tang dynasty) ( 9th century), Tang dynasty chief councilor
 (1471–1538), Ming dynasty mandarin
Mao Yuanxin (born 1941), Mao Zedong's nephew, later known as Li Shi
Lady Li (disambiguation) (李氏), a list of imperial Chinese women with the surname Li

Places in China
Lishi District, the only district of Lüliang, Shanxi
Lishi, Chongqing (李市), a town in Chongqing
Lishi, Guangdong (犁市), a town in Shaoguan, Guangdong
Lishi, Hubei (李市), a town in Shayang County, Hubei
Lishi, Jiangxi (历市), a town in Dingnan County, Jiangxi
Lishi, Sichuan (李市), a town in Longchang, Sichuan
Lishi Subdistrict (李石街道), a subdistrict in Wanghua District, Fushun, Liaoning

See also
Li Si ( 280 BC – 208 BC), legalist politician of the Qin 
Li Zhi (disambiguation)